The IEEE Gustav Robert Kirchhoff Award is a Technical Field Award established by the IEEE Board of Directors in 2003.  This award is presented for outstanding contributions to the fundamentals of any aspect of electronic circuits and systems that has a long-term significance or impact.

The award may be presented to an individual or multiple recipients where all members of the group could be judged to have made a crucial contribution(s) to the overall outcome.

Recipients of this award receive a bronze medal, certificate, and honorarium.

Recipients 

 2021: Thomas Lee
 2020: Martin Hasler
 2019: Kenneth W. Martin 
 2018: Alan N. Willson Jr. 
 2017: Marcel Pelgrom 
 2016: P. P. Vaidyanathan
 2015: Yosiro Oono
 2014: Chung Laung Liu
 2013: Sanjit Kumar Mitra
 2012: Ronald A. Rohrer
 2011: Charles A. Desoer
 2010: Hitoshi Watanabe
 2009: Ernest S. Kuh
 2008: Alfred Fettweis	
 2007: Yannis P. Tsividis
 2006: Gabor Temes
 2005: Leon O. Chua

References

External links 
 IEEE Gustav Robert Kirchhoff Award page at IEEE
 List of recipients of the IEEE Gustav Robert Kirchhoff Award

Gustav Robert Kirchhoff Award